Murder in the Dark is a collection of short fiction by Canadian author Margaret Atwood, published in 1983. Some of the pieces were previously published. The 27 pieces range over a variety of styles, including fictionalized autobiography, parables, travel stories, satires and prose poems. The pieces hold together through their major themes of loss, menace and terror, and men's abuse of power.

The book was republished in 1994, in combination with another Atwood work called Good Bones, as part of the expanded collection Good Bones and Simple Murders.

Contents 
 Autobiography
 Raw Materials
 Murder in the Dark
Murder in the Dark refers to a childhood game (also played by adults) in which one person is secretly appointed murderer, another is appointed detective. The detective leaves the room, and in the dark, the murderer "kills" one of the other players, who screams and plays dead. At the sound of the scream, the detective returns to question all the players, in order to determine who is the murderer. All the players must tell the truth, except for the murderer, who must lie. Atwood uses this game to describe the relationship between the author, reader and critic: the writer is the murderer, the critic is the detective, and the reader is the victim.
 Mute
 Making Poison
 Simmering
Simmering is a satire that presents the future as a time when traditional Western gender roles have been reversed: men are housekeepers and women work in offices. Cooking and recipes are status symbols for men, who develop secret societies with handshakes named after culinary dishes. Women suffer kitchen envy, and still dream of freedom.
 She
 The Boys' Own Annual, 1911
 Women's Novels
 Worship
 Before the War
 Happy Endings
 Iconography
 Horror Comics
 Bread
 Liking Men
 Boyfriends
 The Page
This essay explores the significance of the blank page that a writer stares at while waiting for inspiration.
 Strawberries
 The Victory Burlesk
 Him
 Fainting
 Hopeless
 A Parable
 Hand
 Everlasting
 Instructions for the Third Eye
The "third eye" is the eye that sees harsh reality, which most people prefer to leave blind. But the third eye shows the truth. This story is only about a page long and is written as a series of short paragraphs that "instruct" the reader on how to use one's third eye.

References 

1983 short story collections
Short story collections by Margaret Atwood
New Canadian Library
Coach House Press books